Linda, Be Good is a 1947 American comedy film directed by Frank McDonald and starring Elyse Knox, John Hubbard and Marie Wilson. The film's sets were designed by the art director Lewis H. Creber.

Sidney W. Pink took the film and added some additional footage and released it under the alternative title I Was a Burlesque Queen in 1953.

Synopsis
A married woman joins a burlesque troupe to gather research for a novel she is writing without her husband knowing. However this leads to complications when she meets her husband's boss.

Cast
 Elyse Knox as Linda Prentiss 
 John Hubbard as Roger Prentiss 
 Marie Wilson as Margie LaVitte 
 Gordon Richards as Sam Thompson 
 Jack Norton as Jim Benson 
 Ralph Sanford as Nunnally LaVitte 
 Joyce Compton as Mrs. LaVitte 
 Frank J. Scannell as Eddie Morgan 
 The Cameo Girls as Chorus Line 
 Leonard Bremen as Sgt. Hrublchka
 Gerald Oliver Smith as Butler 
 Claire Carleton as Myrtle 
 Allan Nixon as Officer Jones 
 Byron Foulger as Bookshop Owner 
 Edward Gargan as Frankie 
 Muni Seroff as Maitre d'Hotel 
 Mira McKinney as Mrs. Thompson 
 Professor Lamberti as Prof. Lamberti 
 Sir Lancelot as Calypso Singer
 Marjorie Stapp as Cameo Girl
 Joi Lansing as Cameo Girl

References

Bibliography
 Michael L. Stephens. Art Directors in Cinema: A Worldwide Biographical Dictionary. McFarland, 1998.

External links

I Was a Burlesque Queen at IMDb
Linda Be Good at TCMDB
Linda Be Good at BFI

1947 films
1940s English-language films
1947 comedy films
American comedy films
Films produced by Sidney W. Pink
Films directed by Frank McDonald
Eagle-Lion Films films
American black-and-white films
1940s American films